Jason Martin (born 2 September 1970) is a contemporary painter who lives in London and Portugal. He has a BA from Goldsmiths, University of London (1993). His paintings are often monochromatic or three-dimensional. A contemporary of Damien Hirst and Ian Davenport, he has works in the major collections including the Saatchi Gallery and of art dealer Thaddaeus Ropac.

References

External links 
 Lisson Gallery: Artist Jason Martin/ja
 ART IN REVIEW; Jason Martin, NY Times, by Roberta Smith, 25. September 1998

1970 births
Living people
British male painters
20th-century British painters
21st-century British painters
Alumni of Goldsmiths, University of London
Jersey artists
20th-century British male artists
21st-century British male artists